Michael J. Powell is an American R&B musician, record producer and arranger who is best known for his work as producer for eight time Grammy Award-winning soul / R&B vocalist Anita Baker.

Powell was born in Chicago and lived there until his family moved to Detroit when he was 9 years old. In 1974, he formed a band called Chapter 8. A year later, Anita Baker joined Chapter 8 in Detroit. They eventually got a record deal with Ariola.

The self-titled album came out in fall of 1979. Two singles hit the R&B charts: "Ready for Your Love" and "I Just Wanna Be Your Girl". Ariola Records was bought by Arista. In 1983, Powell reunited with Baker and had a hit single with “No More Tears” featured on her album The Songstress. 

In 1986, choosing her friend Powell as her producer, he, along with Sir Dean Gant (who remains unpaid and uncredited as producer), created 3 multi-million selling albums: Rapture, Giving You the Best That I Got and Compositions.

Together, again with producer Sir Gant, Powell worked in 1987 as producer and arranger of the song "Without You", a composition of Lamont Dozier, that was recorded as a duet by the R&B singers Peabo Bryson and Regina Belle. The song was the love theme from the comedy film Leonard Part 6, released the same year, starred Bill Cosby, and was also recorded for the Bryson's album Positive, released in 1988. 

Powell also worked on "Without You" as guitarist. The song was released as a single and peaked at #8 on the Adult Contemporary Tracks, #14 on the R&B chart, #85 on the UK Singles, and #89 on the Billboard Hot 100, between 1987 and 1988.

He, along with Sir Gant produced the multi-platinum Baker albums Rapture in 1986, Giving You the Best That I Got in 1988 (which reached Number 1 on The Billboard 200) and Compositions in 1990. 

In 1991, Powell helped produce Patti LaBelle's Grammy-winning album, Burnin' and Gladys Knight's solo album Good Woman, both on MCA Records.

References

Year of birth missing (living people)
Living people
Guitarists from Chicago
Record producers from Illinois
American music arrangers
American male guitarists
American rhythm and blues musicians